The 2022 Middle Tennessee Blue Raiders football team represented Middle Tennessee State University as a member of Conference USA (C-USA) during the 2022 NCAA Division I FBS football season. They were led by head coach Rick Stockstill, who was coaching his seventeenth season with the team. The Blue Raiders played their home games at Johnny "Red" Floyd Stadium in Murfreesboro, Tennessee.

Schedule
Middle Tennessee and Conference USA announced the 2022 football schedule on March 30, 2022.

Game summaries

at James Madison

at Colorado State

Tennessee State

at Miami

UTSA

at UAB

Western Kentucky

at UTEP

at Louisiana Tech

Charlotte

Florida Atlantic

at FIU

San Diego State (Hawaii Bowl)

References

Middle Tennessee
Middle Tennessee Blue Raiders football seasons
Hawaii Bowl champion seasons
Middle Tennessee Blue Raiders football